Solem may refer to:

Places
 Solem Ridge, in Palmer Land, Antarctica
 Solem Township, Douglas County, Minnesota

People
 Solem (surname)

Court cases
 Solem v. Bartlett
 Solem v. Helm